Expropriative anarchism is the name given to a practice carried out by certain anarchist affinity groups in Argentina and Spain which involved theft, robbery, scams and counterfeiting currency. The robberies done were called "expropriations on the bourgeoisie". It had its major peak between 1920 and 1935 and some of its most famous practitioners were Buenaventura Durruti, Francisco Ascaso, Severino Di Giovanni, Miguel Arcángel Roscigna, and Lucio Urtubia. It was different from French illegalism because it was not thought of as a way of life but as a way of reaching political ends such as financing revolutionary activities, anarchist propaganda and the release of anarchist prisoners.

Spain 

Los Solidarios (“Solidarity”), also known as Crisol (“Crucible”), was a Spanish anarchist armed-struggle group founded in 1922 or 1923 in Barcelona, as a reply to the 'dirty war' strategy used by the employers and government against trade unions. It was created as a successor to a previous group called Los Justicieros (“The Avenging Ones”), created in Zaragoza. The group was instigated by anarcho-syndicalists, and it set up a network in order to buy and store guns, with which to attack members of the Sindicato Libre, (“Free Trade Union”), an employer-obeying organization. Los Solidarios are considered responsible for bank robberies, such as the Bank of Spain Robbery (September 1923), and for the murder of the Zaragoza cardinal Juan Soldevilla y Romero (1923).

After that, and pressured by the Primo de Rivera dictatorship, Buenaventura Durruti, Francisco Ascaso and other members fled to France, and then to Latin America, where they were charged with more robberies. They returned to Europe, settled down in France, and were charged with making an attempt on the life of Alfonso XIII on a visit to Paris, so they had to live clandestinely. They were expelled from France and settled down in Belgium, where they were allowed to stay. With the advent of the Spanish Second Republic (1931), some of the members that had been able to return to Catalonia decided to enter the Federación Anarquista Ibérica (“Iberian Anarchist Federation”), as a group called Nosotros (“Us”), holding more radical points of view than those of the FAI itself. When the Spanish Civil War broke out, the group dissolved as such, but they kept working inside the FAI.

Argentina 

The first robbery in Argentina for anarchist political ends was executed by the Russian Germán Boris Wladimirovich in 1919. The purpose was to obtain financing for pamphlets which could explain the situation of the Russian Revolution. The robbery failed and Wladimirovich was arrested along with his collaborator Andrés Babby.

Miguel Arcángel Roscigna and Andrés Vázquez Paredes, who had collaborated with Buenaventura Durruti and Los Solidarios when they were in Argentina, later executed a series of bombings against United States interests in response to the execution of Sacco and Vanzetti. In this campaign, the notorious Italian expropriator Severino Di Giovanni joined in. Roscigna y Vázquez Paredes alongside Antonio Moretti and Vicente Moretti carried out a robbery on the Rawson Hospital of Buenos Aires in October, 1927, where they obtained the amount of 141.000 pesos. According to historian Oswaldo Bayer, Roscigna, with this money they financed the counterfeiting of Argentinian currency.

The Moretti brothers and three Catalans recommended by Durruti decided to rob the Cambio Messina in Montevideo, with an outcome of 3 deaths and only 4000 pesos. They ended up being arrested but shortly put in practice a spectacular jailbreak. Di Giovanni started publishing a magazine called Culmine and anarchist propaganda, all of which was financed partly by robberies. The anarcho-syndicalist publication La Protesta started criticizing Di Giovanni and his group in strong terms, even going so far as accusing him of being a spy and a police agent. Rosigna continued the expropriations but with the purpose of aiding anarchist prisoners. This money was used for liberating the anarchists in the Punta Carretas prison. The expropriative anarchists also carried out reprisals against police and state agents who attacked the anarchist movement. Before being arrested Di Giovanni published Anarchia also with "expropriations". He ended up being executed alongside Paulino Scarfó.

Eastern Europe 

Groups such as Rewolucyjni Mściciele (Revolutionary Avengers) and Chernoe Znamia (The Black Banner), active at the beginning of the 20th century, used expropriation as a means to fund their activities.

More recent examples 

Lucio Urtubia Jiménez was a Spanish anarchist famous for his practice of expropriative anarchism. At times compared to Robin Hood, Urtubia carried out bank robberies and forgeries throughout the 1960s and 1970s. In the words of Albert Boadella, "Lucio is a Quijote that did not fight against wind mills, but against a true giant."

References

Bibliography 
 Bayer, Osvaldo. Severino Di Giovanni, el idealista de la violencia. Booket, Buenos Aires, mayo de 2006. 
 Bayer Osvaldo, Los anarquistas expropiadores y otros ensayos. Booket, Buenos Aires, 2008.
 Bayer, Osvaldo. Severino Di Giovanni, el idealista de la violencia. Buenos Aires: Galerna, 1970.
 Noble, Cristina. Severino Di Giovanni, Pasión Anarquista. Buenos Aires: Ed. Capital Intellectual, 2006.

External links 
 Digital Archive of Expropriative Anarchism in Spanish
 On the case of Greek social bandit V. Palaiokostas and the anarchists arrested with him

Illegalism
Anarchist movements
Anarchism in Argentina
Anarchism in Spain